The 1909 Cincinnati Reds season was a season in American baseball. The team finished fourth in the National League with a record of 77–76, 33 games behind the Pittsburgh Pirates.

Offseason 
The Reds replaced player-manager John Ganzel after one season of managing the club. Ganzel led Cincinnati to a 73–81 record in the 1908 season. His replacement was former New York Highlanders manager Clark Griffith, who had managed the club from 1903 until 1908, posting a 437–370 record. Griffith also pitched with the Highlanders until he retired in 1907. He also was a player-manager with the Chicago White Sox from 1901 to 1902, going 157–113 in his two seasons with the club, and led them to the pennant in 1901.

On December 12, the Reds traded catcher Admiral Schlei to the St. Louis Cardinals, getting pitchers Art Fromme and Ed Karger. Fromme had a 5–13 record with a 2.72 ERA with the Cardinals in 1908, and Karger was 15–19 with a 2.04 ERA in 39 starts.

Cincinnati continued to make moves in the winter months, as on January 18, the team traded outfielder John Kane to the Chicago Cubs for outfielder Blaine Durbin and shortstop Tom Downey. Durbin appeared in only 14 games with the Cubs in 1908, hitting .250 in 32 at-bats. Downey had not yet appeared in majors; however, he was expected to compete with Rudy Hulswitt for the starting shortstop job.

Also on January 18, the Reds acquired outfielder Rebel Oakes from the Los Angeles Angels of the Pacific Coast League in exchange for outfielder Tom Daley and Rube Ellis. Oakes batted .288 with the Angels, and had 212 hits in the 1908 season.

Regular season 

Newly acquired Tom Downey became the Reds starting shortstop, and the club traded away Rudy Hulswitt to the St. Louis Cardinals on May 2. Downey finished his rookie season with a .231 batting average, hitting one home run and had 32 RBI, while stealing 16 bases in 119 games. Another rookie, Rebel Oakes, hit .270 with three home runs, 31 RBI, and 23 stolen bases in 120 games while playing in the outfield.

Dick Hoblitzell became the Reds starting first baseman, and the 20 year old had a great season, batting .308 with four home runs and 67 RBI in 142 games. Outfielder Mike Mitchell led the Reds with a .310 batting average, while hitting four home runs and a team-high 86 RBI in 145 games. Outfielder Bob Bescher hit .240 and led the Reds with 56 stolen bases.

Newly acquired pitcher Art Fromme anchored the pitching staff, earning a record of 19–13 with a 1.90 ERA in 37 games, pitching a team high 279.1 innings, while throwing 22 complete games. Harry Gaspar also had a great season, going 19–11 with a 2.01 ERA in 44 games.

Season summary 
The Reds got off to a good start in 1909, going 7–2 in their first nine games to take an early division lead. However, the club fell under .500 following a 3-10 stretch, knocking them out of first place. The club eventually rebounded, and through 73 games, the Reds had a 40–33 record, but the club still found themselves in only fourth place, 13.5 games behind the first place Pittsburgh Pirates. Cincinnati would finish the season with a 77–76 record, making it the first time since 1905 that the club finished over .500. They finished in fourth place, 33.5 games behind the Pirates.

Season standings

Record vs. opponents

Notable transactions 
 May 28, 1909: Blaine Durbin was traded by the Reds to the Pittsburgh Pirates for Ward Miller and cash.

Roster

Player stats

Batting

Starters by position 
Note: Pos = Position; G = Games played; AB = At bats; H = Hits; Avg. = Batting average; HR = Home runs; RBI = Runs batted in

Other batters 
Note: G = Games played; AB = At bats; H = Hits; Avg. = Batting average; HR = Home runs; RBI = Runs batted in

Pitching

Starting pitchers 
Note: G = Games pitched; IP = Innings pitched; W = Wins; L = Losses; ERA = Earned run average; SO = Strikeouts

Other pitchers 
Note: G = Games pitched; IP = Innings pitched; W = Wins; L = Losses; ERA = Earned run average; SO = Strikeouts

Relief pitchers 
Note: G = Games pitched; W = Wins; L = Losses; SV = Saves; ERA = Earned run average; SO = Strikeouts

Notes

References 
1909 Cincinnati Reds season at Baseball Reference

Cincinnati Reds seasons
Cincinnati Reds season
Cincinnati Reds